Homag, or Homak or Homay or Homa may refer to:
 Homay, East Azerbaijan
 Homag-e Bala, Hormozgan Province
 Homag-e Pain, Hormozgan Province
 Homay, Iran (disambiguation)